The Women's Premier Division is a rugby union club competition for women that is played in South Africa. it is supported by the South African Rugby Union (SARU).

History
The first South African Inter-Provincial Women's Rugby tournament was held in August 2002 in Port Elizabeth and was won by Falcons.
The first women rugby union championship was launched in April 2003 under the name of SARU Women's Interprovincial Championship.

In 2018 SARU decided to reform the Championship which was renamed the Women's Premier Division. DHL Western Province won in 2019 and Border Ladies won in 2021 for the fifth time.

List of winners

SARU Women's Interprovincial Tournament winners

SARU Women's Interprovincial Championship winners

Women's Premier Division winners

Champions by club

References

External links
Women's Premier Division - sarugby.co.za

Rugby union competitions in South Africa
South Africa
2003 establishments in South Africa